Un inviato molto speciale (translated: "A very special correspondent") is an Italian television series aired in Italy from September 15 to October 27, 1992 on Rai 2. The series is set in Bari and Rome; it also moves in Africa in the penultimate episode. It revolves around the adventures of Damiano Tarantella, a RAI special correspondent. The main actor is Lino Banfi.

Story
Damiano Tarantella is a middle-aged journalist who works in the RAI headquarters in Bari, by chance being the correspondent from Bari to the 90° Minuto program for the match between Bari-Juventus, where, however, he does not turns out to be fit to the role as the fan within him comes out. But this makes him famous and is called to the place in Rome where, although getting in trouble several times, he is hired. Each service, even the simplest entrusted to him, becomes full of adventures and trouble, from which, however, he always manages to come out more or less well.

Episodes

See also
List of Italian television series

External links
 

Italian television series
RAI original programming